Sri Seeta Rama Jananam is a 1944 Indian Telugu-language Hindu mythological film, produced and directed by Ghantasala Balaramayya under the Pratibha Productions banner. The film stars Akkineni Nageswara Rao, Tripurasundari, Vemuri Gaggayya, Rushyendramani. Music was jointly composed by Prabhala Satyanarayana and Ogirala Ramachandra Rao. The film marks the debut of Akkineni Nageswara Rao as a lead actor. It is also the debut of Ghantasala as a chorus singer and in a character role. The film was a commercial failure.

Plot
The film begins with Ravana (Vemuri Gaggayya) trouncing the universe which establishes him as autocratic. Once on his journey, he febrile to the beauty of Rambha (Sowdamini) and molests her. Being cognizant of it, Nalakubara curses him to burn into asks when he aspires to possess any woman against her wish. However, his ferocities peek at the summit, when all the creators bow before Lord Vishnu one that gives assurance of salvation to eliminate the monster.

Meanwhile, Goddess Lakshmi takes birth as Vedavathi (Chandrakala) on Earth. At one juncture, Ravana lusts on her when she immediately sacrifices herself with a curse to be reborn as a cause for the destruction of his dynasty. Thereafter, Vedavathi takes birth in Lanka which appals Mandodari (Kamakshi). So, she discards the baby in a box and buries it on either side of the sea. Eventually, Dasaratha (T. Venkateswarlu), the king of Ayodhya is perturbed as childless, so, he conducts Putrakameshti Yaaga with his 3 wives and they are blessed with 4 sons who are the reincarnations of Lord Vishnu, Adhi Sesha, Shankha, & Chakra as Rama, Lakshmana, Bharata, & Shatragnya respectively.

Parallelly, Janaka (Parupalli Subbarao) the king of Mithila while tilling the ground, finds the box enclosing the baby whom he rears as Seeta. Time passes, Saint Viswamitra (Ballijepalli Lakshmikantham) arrives and seeks to send Rama (Akkineni Nageswara Rao) & Lakshmana (B. N. Raju) for the protection of his Yaga. Soon, Viswamitra endorses them with powerful armaments which destroy Tataki & Marichasubhahulu and accomplishes the Yaga.

Just as, Janaka announces Swayamvaram to Seeta, learning it, Viswamitra moves to Mithila along with Rama & Lakshmana. On the way, Rama makes a stone form of Ahalya into normal. Here, the challenge is to affix the world-renowned bow of Lord Siva. Nevertheless, Ravana too arrives without an invitation but fails and is humiliated. All at once, Rama lefts the bow and breaks it. Knowing it, enraged Parasurama (again Vemuri Gaggayya) lands at Mithila and confronts Rama. Later, he realizes him as his reincarnation and backs up. Finally, the movie ends on a happy note with the phenomenal wedding of Seeta & Rama.

Cast

Akkineni Nageswara Rao as Lord Srirama 
Tripurasundari as Goddess Seeta 
Vemuri Gaggayya as Ravana & Parasurama
Balijepalli Lakshmikantham as Visvamitra   
B. N. Raju as Lakshmana 
T. Venkateswarlu as Dasaratha 
Parupalli Satyanarayana as Vasishta
Parupalli Subba Rao as Janaka 
Lanka Satyam as Wizard
Kumpatla Subba Rao as Rushi
Koteswara Rao as Sukracharya
Rushyendramani as Kausalya
Kamala Kotnis as Kaikeyi  
Annapurna as Sumitra
Kamakshi as Mandodari
Chandrakala as Vedavati
Vijaya as Urmila
Sowdamini as Rambha 
T. G. Kamala Devi as Ahalya 
Ratna Kumari as Maya Rakshasi
Anjanibai as Rushipatni
Baby Kumari Champa as Young Seeta
Baby Vasundhara as Young Urumi

Soundtrack

Music composed by Prabhala Satyanarayana, Ogirala Ramachandra Rao.

Box-office
The film ran for 100 days at Durga Kala Mandir, Vijayawada.

References

1944 films
1940s Telugu-language films
Indian black-and-white films
Films based on the Ramayana
Films scored by Prabhala Satyanarayana
Films scored by Ogirala Ramachandra Rao